Patrik Hrehorčák (born March 18, 1999) is a Slovak professional ice hockey defenceman playing for HC Oceláři Třinec of the Czech Extraliga (ELH).

Career 
Hrehorčák previously played two seasons in the Quebec Major Junior Hockey League for the Rouyn-Noranda Huskies, where he won the President's Cup and the Memorial Cup in 2019. He signed with Oceláři Třinec on June 20, 2019, and made his debut for the team on September 13, 2019.

References

External links

1999 births
Living people
HC Oceláři Třinec players
Rouyn-Noranda Huskies players
Slovak ice hockey left wingers
Sportspeople from Poprad
Slovak expatriate ice hockey players in Canada
Slovak expatriate ice hockey players in the Czech Republic